Sarah Potomak (born December 19, 1997) is a Canadian ice hockey player that competed with the Under 18 Canadian national women's hockey team. She made her debut with the Canada women's national ice hockey team at the 2015 4 Nations Cup, being held from November 4–8 in Sundsvall, Sweden. Along with her sister Amy Potomak, they are the first sister duo named to the roster of Canada's national women's ice hockey team. The two played together in a two-game series against the United States national women's ice hockey team in December 2016.

Playing career
Along with fellow British Columbia resident Micah Zandee-Hart, Potomak was invited to participate in the IIHF’s 2013 Women’s High Performance Camp in Sheffield, England. Potomak and Hart were also members of Team BC that competed at the 2012 and 2013 Canadian Women’s U18 National Hockey Championships.

She was a member of Team BC’s women’s ice hockey team, playing alongside her sister Amy Potomak, at the 2015 Canada Winter Games. Team BC would finish the event in sixth place.

Team Canada 
Potomak won a gold medal at the 2014 IIHF World Women's U18 Championship in Budapest, Hungary where she collected 8 points. She won silver at the 2015 IIHF World Women's U18 Championship in Buffalo, New York where she collected 9 points. She played for the national team at the 2017 IIHF Women's World Championship. She won a silver medal and collected 1 assist. She was named to Canada's National Women's Team for the 2018 Four Nations Cup but was unable to pay due to an injury.

NCAA
Potomak made her debut for the Minnesota Golden Gophers in a September 25, 2015 exhibition match against the Minnesota Whitecaps logging two assists on goals scored by Hannah Brandt as the squad prevailed by a 5-4 tally.

Her regular season debut took place on October 1, 2015 in a 2-0 win against Penn State. Potomak scored an empty net goal, for the first goal of her NCAA career. In a two-game sweep of St. Cloud State on October 9–10, 2015, Potomak accumulated two goals and four assists. In the second game against St. Cloud, she logged the first multi-goal game of her NCAA career.

An 11-1 win against the MSU-Mankato Mavericks in November 2015 saw Potomak tie the program record for most points in one game. She would register a seven point output consisting two goals and five assists. Potomak was featured in Sports Illustrated’s Faces in the Crowd segment for the week of December 14, 2015. She scored her 100th career point in the series sweep against North Dakota on February 10–11, 2017.

During the 2017–18 season, she redshirted the season to centralize with Canada’s National Women’s Team in preparation for the 2018 Winter Olympic Games in PyeongChang, South Korea. She was released from the team in December 2017.

She finished her collegiate career with 179 points.

Coaching 
Potomak joined the Trinity Western University women's hockey team as an assistant coach prior to the 2020-21 season. While coaching, she will also be studying to earn her master's degree in leadership and education. Her sister Amy will join the team for the 2022-23 season as a grad transfer.

Statistics

NCAA

Statistics source

Awards and honours
Top Forward, 2012 Canadian U18 Nationals

Hockey Canada
Leading scorer, 2014 IIHF World Women's U18 Championships
IIHF Directorate Award, Top Forward, 2015 IIHF World Women's U18 Championships
Most Valuable Player, 2015 IIHF World Women's U18 Championships
Media All-Star Team, 2015 IIHF World Women's U18 Championships

NCAA
2015-16 WCHA Preseason Rookie of the Year
WCHA Rookie of the Week (Week of October 13, 2015)
WCHA Player of the Week (Recognized for games of October 14–15, 2016) 
WCHA Player of the Month (October 2016) 
2016 Women's Hockey Commissioners Association National Rookie of the Year
2016 WCHA Rookie of the Year honors
Most Outstanding Player Award, 2016 NCAA National Collegiate Women's Ice Hockey Tournament
2017 Patty Kazmaier Award Top-10 Finalist
All-WCHA Second Team
All-USCHO Third Team
WCHA All-Academic Team
Academic All-Big Ten honoree
WCHA Offensive Player of the Week (Week of October 15, 2017)
WCHA Offensive Player of the Month (October 2017)
Preseason All-WCHA honoree
WCHA All-Academic Team 
Academic All-Big Ten honoree
WCHA Forward of the Week (Week of February 26, 2019)
WCHA Forward of the Month (February 2019)
All-WCHA Third Team
Big Ten Distinguished Scholar
WCHA Scholar-Athlete
WCHA All-Academic 
Academic All-Big Ten honoree
WCHA Forward of the Month (November 2019)
WCHA Forward of the Week (Week of January 5, 2020)

Personal
Her brother, Brandon Potomak is a member of the Moose Jaw Warriors. He captured a gold medal in ice hockey at the 2011 Canada Winter Games. Younger sister Amy played with her at the University of Minnesota for the 2018–19 and 2019–20 seasons.

References

External links

Minnesota bio

Living people
1997 births
Minnesota Golden Gophers women's ice hockey players
Canadian women's ice hockey forwards
Ice hockey people from British Columbia
Canadian expatriate ice hockey players in the United States
Professional Women's Hockey Players Association players